Don Wayne "Bubba" Shobert (born January 29, 1962 in Lubbock, Texas) is an American former professional motorcycle racer. He was a three-time A.M.A. Grand National Champion from 1985 to 1987 and was AMA Superbike Champion in 1988 while riding for American Honda.

In 1989 Shobert moved up to the Grand Prix world championship riding for Honda. Unfortunately, Shobert's Grand Prix career was cut short at the third race of the season, where he was involved in a terrible crash with Kevin Magee on the cool off lap after the race, wherein Shobert drove into the back of Magee's motorcycle. Magee had stopped his motorcycle in the middle of the track and was performing a rear-wheel "burnout". Eddie Lawson narrowly missed hitting Magee's bike after he and Shobert had just finished congratulating each other moments earlier and were not looking forward. Shobert suffered severe head injuries but was able to make a full recovery after months of rehabilitation. He never raced again, taking instead roles as manager in some teams of AMA Grand National dirt track .

Shobert was inducted into the Motorcycle Hall of Fame in 1998.

He was inducted into the Motorsports Hall of Fame of America in 2007.

References

External links
 Bubba Shobert at the AMA Motorcycle Hall of Fame

1962 births
Living people
Sportspeople from Lubbock, Texas
American motorcycle racers
AMA Grand National Championship riders
AMA Superbike Championship riders
500cc World Championship riders
250cc World Championship riders
Superbike World Championship riders